Hywood is a surname. Notable people with the surname include:

Greg Hywood (born 1954), Australian journalist
Steve Hywood (born 1950), Australian rules footballer

See also
Haywood (surname)